The Chronicles of Xan is a series of historical novels written by Antony Barone. It currently consists of Shadow in the Dark, with a sequel, The Haunted Cathedral, due out Winter 2007.

Shadow in the Dark

Plot summary

Xan is a boy who lived in his village, Hardonbury, in 12th Century England. One morning while he was in a forest nearby, his village is attacked by bandits. He rushes back to his home, only to trip on a root, resulting in the boy being gravely injured. He is taken to Harwood Abbey, where he is nursed back to health by the Benedictine monks. In addition to the physical damage he sustained from his accident, he has lost his memory. But what he fears most of all is what he has thought he has seen lurking around the abbey: the Grim Reaper.

In hopes of finding Xan's parents and jogging his memory, a kindly monk, Brother Andrew, brings Xan back to his village, only to find that it was burnt down in the attack and that all the villagers had fled to Clovis, the closest village. In Clovis they meet a farmer who worked with Xan's parents, who tells them that Xan's real name (for Xan is only what they called him at the abbey) is Stephen, and that his parents are dead. The night he returns to the abbey, the other boys show him the "Grim Reaper" outside. Xan, ready to disprove the boys, follows the cloaked figure to the room of a harsh and rough monk, Brother Leo. Later that night the same bandits that attacked Xan's village attack the abbey. However, no one was killed, not even Brother Leo from the Grim Reaper.

Xan finds a coin that a bandit dropped on the floor, with the coat of arms of Lord Kensington, the owner of Clovis. He also "accidentally" overhears some conversations in which Brother Leo is trying to persuade the monks to sell the abbey to Lord Kensington so they can have guards from bandit attacks. A couple of nights after the conversations, the Abbot of the abbey was almost killed in an assassination attempt. Coincidentally, the Abbot was also the one who was most against Brother Leo's plan. Xan pieces together the puzzle and concludes that Brother Leo tried to kill the abbot to get the abbey to be sold to Lord Kensington.

After he confesses his suspicions to Brother Andrew, they put it to the test by going to see Lord Kensington and ask if Brother Leo had been to see him. Lord Kensington's bailiff, Sir James, confirms this by telling them that he had, but that he was surprised that such a gentle and kind monk would do such a thing. After they leave, Xan remembers about the coin, which also links Lord Kensington to the incident. So Lord Kensington hired the bandits to attack the abbey, and when that failed, he hired Brother Leo to try to assassinate the Abbot.

Brother Andrew, Xan, and Father Paul (the acting Abbot) ask for an audience with Lord Kensington with a magistrate present so they can expose the criminal behind the attacks. However, when presented the evidence, Lord Kensington exclaims that he had never seen the gentle monk and was appalled by these accusations. Xan finally realizes his mistake and corrects the accusations. It was Lord Kensington's bailiff that hired the bandits to attack the abbey, and Brother Leo wasn't involved at all. Sir James hired another bandit to assassinate the Abbot after the first attack failed. Sir James and Lord Kensington didn't know Brother Leo because they both called him gentle, when he is also gruff and not gentle in speech. With this finally made clear, Lord Kensington assembles his knights to Harwood Abbey, where another attack was surely waiting.

They arrive at the abbey just as the attack starts and are able to fend off the attack. Shortly after they arrive, Xan falls off his horse and gets knocked unconscious after all his memories flooded back to him. When he awakes, the attack is over and most of the bandits are captured or dead. He tells Brother Andrew that he remembers who he was and his family. However, he still keeps the name Xan as a reminder that his old life is behind him and that this is his new life. The Abbot visits the bandit leader, Carlo, and forgives him, possibly rekindling the spark of goodness he has in him.

List of Characters

Abbot: The head of Harwood Abbey who is almost assassinated by the bandit Carlo, but recovers and in the end forgives him.
Brother Andrew: A kind young monk who mentors Xan throughout the book. He becomes like a father to Xan, and Xan often goes to him for advice.
Brother Leo: A rough old monk who saved Xan's life. He is falsely accused of attacking the Abbot, and is thrown in the abbey's confinement cell until he is proven innocent by Xan.
Carlo: The leader of the bandits that attacked Hardonbury and Harwood Abbey. He tried to assassinate the Abbot under Sir James' order, but failed.
Father Clement: A strong leader who is the acting abbot after the Abbot is attacked. He presented the evidence to Lord Kensington and always obeyed the Abbot's wishes.
Joshua: Xan's best friend. Josh is a young and naive boy who is always at Xan's side. He and Xan figure out parts of the mystery together.
Lord Kensington: A powerful man who owns much land, including Clovis and Hardonbury. He is thought to be in league with the bandits until Xan proves him innocent.
Lucy: One of Xan's closest friends. She is a kind and smart girl. Xan often consults her in regards to the mystery and when he needs someone to talk to.
Sir James: Lord Kensington's bailiff. Sir James hired bandits to attack Hardonbury and Harwood Abbey so they would join Lord Kensington's estate. He was stealing money from Lord Kensington for years.
Sister Regina: A mother figure to Xan. She helped lift Xan's spirits when he was feeling depressed. He turns to her for advice about coping with being an orphan.
Xan: A young boy whose parents were killed in the attack at Hardonbury. His real name is Stephen, but he no longer uses the name. He lost his memory, but recovers it at the end of the first book.

The Haunted Cathedral

The Haunted Cathedral is the sequel to Shadow in the Dark and is due out Winter 2007

External links
Chronicles of Xan Official Website
Capstone Fiction Official Website

2007 American novels
Novel series
American historical novels

Novels set in the 12th century